Geílson de Carvalho Soares (born April 10, 1984 in Cuiabá), sometimes referred to as simply Geílson, is a striker.

Club statistics

Honours
Rio Grande do Sul State League: 2004
São Paulo State League: 2006

References

External links

 furacao
 sambafoot
 CBF

1984 births
Living people
People from Cuiabá
Brazilian footballers
Brazilian expatriate footballers
Santos FC players
Club Athletico Paranaense players
Mirassol Futebol Clube players
Albirex Niigata players
Campeonato Brasileiro Série A players
J2 League players
Expatriate footballers in Japan
Sport Club Internacional players
Guarani FC players
Clube Atlético Votuporanguense players
Association football forwards
CE Operário Várzea-Grandense players
Sportspeople from Mato Grosso